BVT may refer to:
 The Bobby Van Trust, a group of charities that improve home security in the UK
 BVT Surface Fleet, former name of BAE Systems Maritime – Naval Ships, British naval shipbuilding company
 Bandwidth-variable transponder, a type of transponder used in optical networks
 The Beaverton Valley Times, a weekly newspaper in Oregon, United States
 Bee venom therapy, a type of apitherapy
 Blackstone Valley Regional Vocational Technical High School, a technical high school in Upton, Massachusetts
 BVT, ISO 3166-1 alpha-3 country code for Bouvet Island
 Borrowed Virtual Time, a soft real-time algorithm for Scheduling (computing)
 Bournville Village Trust, the governing body of Bournville, England
 Brevet (military), a warrant authorizing a commissioned officer to hold a higher rank temporarily
 Build verification test, a procedure in software testing
 Bundesamt für Verfassungsschutz und Terrorismusbekämpfung (Federal Office for the Protection of the Constitution and Counterterrorism), Austria's intelligence agency
 Black Velvet Travel, a bus company in Hampshire, England.
 Bek Vol Tanden, Dutch expression
 Boundary volume tree, another name for Bounding volume hierarchy
 BVT Publishing, an American publisher of textbooks